Sir Mian Abdul Rashid, KCSI (29 June 1889 – 6 November 1981) was the first Chief Justice of Pakistan, legal philosopher, one of the founding fathers of Pakistan, and a jurist.

Education
He was born on 29 June 1889 in a well-known Arain family, namely Mian family of Baghbanpura of Lahore. He received his early education at Central Model School in Lahore, and got his B.A. from Forman Christian College, also in Lahore, and a Tripos and Masters from Christ's College, Cambridge University in 1912. 

In 1913, he was called to the Bar from the Middle Temple, London.

Law career
He started practising law at Multan and later shifted to Lahore in 1913 where he joined the chambers of Mian Muhammad Shafi. He was then appointed Assistant Legal Remembrancer. In the summer of 1923, he was appointed acting judge of Lahore High Court on recommendation of Shadi Lal, who was then Chief Justice of the said court. From 1927 to 1931, he officiated as Government of Punjab's Advocate. He was appointed Judge, Lahore High Court in 1933. In 1946, he was made Chief Justice of Judicature at Lahore, and was knighted in that year's Birthday Honours list.

First Chief Justice of Pakistan
On 15 August 1947, when Quaid-i-Azam Muhammad Ali Jinnah was sworn in as the first Governor-General of Pakistan, Rashid, as the most senior Muslim judge in British India, administered the oath of office to him.

Awards and recognition
 In 2005, the Government of Pakistan honoured him by naming a main road (7th Avenue) after him in the federal capital, Islamabad. The former Seventh Avenue down to Khayaban-i-Suhrawardy and the Kashmir Highway has been renamed Justice Sir Mian Abdul Rashid Avenue.
 Hilal-e-Pakistan (Crescent of Pakistan) Award by the President of Pakistan

See also
 List of Pakistanis
 Chief Justice of Pakistan
 Arain

References

Bibliography

External links
 Biography on the Judiciary Section of the Overseas Pakistanis Foundation website
 List of former Judges of the Pakistani Supreme Court

1889 births
1981 deaths
Punjabi people
People from Lahore
Forman Christian College alumni
Alumni of Christ's College, Cambridge
Chief justices of Pakistan
Leaders of the Pakistan Movement
Members of the Inner Temple
Legal history of Pakistan
20th-century Pakistani philosophers
Mian family
Indian Knights Bachelor
Pakistani judges
Knights Commander of the Order of the Star of India
Justices of the Supreme Court of Pakistan
Central Model School, Lahore alumni
Recipients of Hilal-i-Pakistan
Vice-Chancellors of the University of the Punjab